Northside Shopping Centre is a shopping centre located in Coolock, a suburban area in Dublin's Northside. One of the earliest shopping centres in Ireland, it was built in 1970 and is the only one with a swimming pool. It has been expanded and refurbished and renovated a number of times and passed through the hands of the National Asset Management Agency, before being sold to Patron Capital. Patron then sold the centre for a sum of €50 million in 2019 to German company Am Alpha

History
The centre was originally constructed in 1970 as an open-air facility, designed by Stephenson Gibney & Associates. It, along with Stillorgan Shopping Centre, which remained open-air for decades, was one of the first modern shopping centres in Ireland.  The local authority, then Dublin Corporation, arranged for a municipal swimming pool, constructed above the shopping centre proper.

Renovations and extension in the 1980s and 2008 have covered most of Sam Stephenson's original open-space concept.

In 2013 it was announced that a €5 million further refurbishment was about to commence in the centre. This followed the loss of the anchor non-food store, a Dunnes Stores branch, and saw the arrival of new shops, including Heatons (with Sportsworld), new dining facilities, and a Well Woman Centre. The refurbishment was completed in late 2016 following a 2-phase modernisation of both interior and exterior.

The centre was numbered among the property assets of NAMA, Ireland's post-recession National Asset Management Agency; it was subsequently sold to Patron Capital for €49m.

Popular media
The branch of Paddy Power bookmakers in the car park was one of the venues visited in a Channel 4's Undercover Boss episode 3, season 4.

Competition
Three other centres, Omni Park Shopping Centre, Artaine Castle Shopping Centre and Clarehall Shopping Centre, compete for business in the area.

References

External links
 Northside Shopping Centre

Coolock
Shopping centres in County Dublin
Buildings and structures in Dublin (city)